The 2022 Asian Men's Handball Championship was the 20th edition of the Asian Men's Handball Championship, held from 18 to 31 January 2022 in Saudi Arabia under the aegis of the International Handball Federation (IHF) and Asian Handball Federation (AHF). It was the second time in history that the championship was organised by the Saudi Arabian Handball Federation (SAHF). It also acted as a qualification tournament for the 2023 World Men's Handball Championship, with the top five teams from the championship directly qualifying for the event.

Initially, the championship was scheduled to be held in Iran, but on 1 September 2021, the AHF decided to move the event to Saudi Arabia due to the spread of COVID-19 in Iran.

Qatar won their fifth consecutive and overall title by defeating Bahrain in the final.

Venues
The tournament was played in two venues.

Draw
The draw was held on 6 December 2021 at the King Abdulaziz Center for World Culture, Dhahran.

Seeding
Teams were seeded according to the AHF COC regulations and rankings of the previous edition of the championship. Teams who did not participated in the previous edition were in Pot 4.

 Thailand withdrew before the draw.
 Japan withdrew due to several positive COVID-19 tests inside their team.

Preliminary round
All times are local (UTC+3).

Group A

Group B

Group C

Report

Group D

Martyr Fahad Al-Ahmad Al-Sabah Cup

Group III

Group IV

15th place game

13th place game

Eleventh place game

Ninth place game

Main round

Group I

Group II

Final round

Bracket

Semifinals

Seventh place game

Fifth place game

Third place game

Final

Report

Final ranking

Notes

References

2022 Men
Asian Men's Handball Championship
International handball competitions hosted by Saudi Arabia
2022 in Saudi Arabian sport
Asian Men's Handball Championship